is a Japanese field hockey player for the Japanese national team.

She participated at the 2018 Women's Hockey World Cup.

References

1988 births
Living people
Japanese female field hockey players
Field hockey players at the 2018 Asian Games
Asian Games gold medalists for Japan
Asian Games medalists in field hockey
Medalists at the 2018 Asian Games